Manuel Fiestas Arce (born December 25, 1909, date of death unknown) was a Peruvian basketball player who competed in the 1936 Summer Olympics. He was part of the Peruvian basketball team, which finished eighth in the Olympic tournament. He played both matches.

His brother, Eduardo, is also a basketball player who played during the 1948 Olympics.

References

External links

1909 births
Year of death missing
Peruvian men's basketball players
Olympic basketball players of Peru
Basketball players at the 1936 Summer Olympics
20th-century Peruvian people